South of the Border is the third album by American easy listening brass band Herb Alpert & the Tijuana Brass, originally released in 1964. The name of the group, for this album, is "Herb Alpert's Tijuana Brass".

Background
Alpert's first top ten hit, and fifth gold record, the album continued the progression of the Tijuana Brass from its mostly-Mexican sound to a more easy-listening style, with a collection of cover versions of popular songs. Included were "I've Grown Accustomed to Her Face", originally featured in the Broadway musical My Fair Lady and The Beatles' 1963 hit "All My Loving". It also featured an instrumental cover of its title song, "South of the Border", which was most famously done as a vocal by Frank Sinatra.

One number, a Sol Lake tune called "The Mexican Shuffle", was reworked for a TV ad for a brand of chewing gum, and styled "The Teaberry Shuffle". Bert Kaempfert, author of several songs covered by the Brass, returned the favor by issuing a cover of "The Mexican Shuffle". The number called "El Presidente", was a reorchestration of Sol Lake's "Winds of Barcelona", which had appeared on Volume 2.

The cover features model Sandra Moss (Mrs. Jerry Moss at the time) at the Patio del Moro apartment complex in West Hollywood.

Critical reception

In a retrospective review for Allmusic, music critic Lindsay Planer praised the albums variety and noted the ballads "never seeming maudlin or unnecessarily over the top."

Track listing

Side 1
"South of the Border" (Jimmy Kennedy, Michael Carr) - 2:06
"The Girl from Ipanema" (Norman Gimbel, Antônio Carlos Jobim, Vinícius de Moraes) - 2:35
"Hello, Dolly!" (Jerry Herman) - 1:55
"I've Grown Accustomed to Her Face" (Alan Jay Lerner, Frederick Loewe) - 2:25
"Up Cherry Street" (Julius Wechter) - 2:13
"Mexican Shuffle" (Sol Lake) - 2:09

Side 2
"El Presidente" (Sol Lake) - 2:28
"All My Loving" (John Lennon, Paul McCartney) - 1:53
"Angelito" (René Herrera, René Ornelas) - 2:20
"Salud, Amor y Dinero (Health, Love and Money)" (Sol Lake) - 2:05
"Número Cinco (Number Five)" (Ervan Coleman) - 2:19
"Adiós, Mi Corazón (Goodbye, My Heart)" (Sol Lake) - 2:39

References

1964 albums
Herb Alpert albums
Albums produced by Jerry Moss
Albums produced by Herb Alpert
A&M Records albums
Albums recorded at Gold Star Studios